The Tampa Bay Devil Rays' 2007 season, the tenth season in franchise history, involved the Devil Rays trying to improve on their 2006 season, where they finished last in the American League East Division, and managed to finish the season with a league-worst record of 66–96. During the offseason they signed Japanese infielder Akinori Iwamura to a three-year deal. Their manager was Joe Maddon, who entered his second season with the Devil Rays.

Although the Devil Rays again finished last in the division, they improved their record by five games, to 66-96.  Their season attendance increased by 18,653 to 1,387,603.  This marks the first time home attendance has increased in consecutive seasons.  Joe Maddon's option years through 2009 were picked up by the club on September 8, 2007.  The season was marked by incredible pitching performances by club ace Scott Kazmir and rookie James Shields, and the bats of club standby Carl Crawford; rookies Delmon Young, B.J. Upton and Brendan Harris; and free agents Akinori Iwamura and Carlos Peña.  Several club single-season records fell during the course of the season.

This was also the last season with the team being named the Devil Rays. The team dropped the "Devil" from the name. The following year, the team would win the AL East, beating the usual contenders in the Yankees and the Red Sox. The team would win the pennant, but lost to the Philadelphia Phillies in the World Series.

Regular season
The Devil Rays opened their 2007 season April 2, on the road against the defending division champion New York Yankees.  The bullpen blew a lead and Tampa Bay lost, 9-5, but came back to win the third game, 7-6 (the second of the opening series was rained out).  They suffered a setback in the middle of April when new third baseman Iwamura, off to a hot start with a .339 batting average to that point, suffered an oblique strain and went on the disabled list.  However, the team continued to play better than in past years, and on May 4 moved into a tie for second place, the latest that Tampa Bay had been that high in the standings since the 1999 season.

The Rays trailed off going into May, falling eventually back into last place, but surged into their series in Orlando, Florida, against the Texas Rangers, which they swept. After the series with the Rangers, they won only one of the next seven games, skidding to a then season low, nine games below .500.

After a 9-4 win against the Dodgers to improve their record to 33-40 on June 24, the Devil Rays went on to lose 11 straight games and went on to lose 13 of 14 games since the Dodgers series and went into the All-Star Break 34-53.  After the break it wasn't much better losing 3 games out of 4 against the Yankees in their 1st series after the break and went on to lose 8 straight games between July 21 to 28. The low point of that losing streak were two dismal losses to the Yankees. One game losing 17-5 and the other 21-4.  The Rays' lack of pitching between their two aces and closer Al Reyes led to the coining of the idiom, "Kazmir and Shields, then off come the wheels."

For the Devil Rays it was a July to forget but things were getting better in August.  Improvements made to the bullpen at the trade deadline led to shorter losing streaks and, eventually, more series wins.  On August 11, Starting pitcher Edwin Jackson pitched the Devil Rays 1st complete game shutout of the year in a 3-0 win against the Rangers. On August 25, Pitcher Scott Kazmir went 8 innings with a career high 13 strikeouts in a 14-3 win against the Oakland Athletics and in that series the Rays took 3 of 4 games out scoring the A's 33 to 9 in the last three games of that series.  The hot streak continued with a sweep of the tailspinning Baltimore Orioles and series wins at the Yankees and home against the Orioles and the Blue Jays before finally losing 2 of 3 at the Boston Red Sox and splitting a 4-game series at the Seattle Mariners.

Their September upswing ensured that they would finish the 2007 season with a better record than the 2006 season.  They did, however, hobble into the end of the season, with Carl Crawford's season-ending groin pull in late-September contributing to a 5-13 finish.  They did win their final game of the season, though, giving hope for next year.

New team records
Andy Sonnanstine broke a team record with seven consecutive strikeouts on June 10 in a victory over the Florida Marlins, his first win of the season.

On September 3, Carlos Peña broke the club single-season home run record, previously 34, held by José Canseco and Aubrey Huff.  Peña's 35th was a two-run homer off Jim Hoey in the seventh inning of a 9-7 victory over the Baltimore Orioles.  On September 16, he became the first Rays player to hit 40 home runs in a season, the 40th being a leadoff homer coming off Jarrod Washburn in the 4th inning of a 9-2 victory over the Seattle Mariners.  His 45th home run came off Dustin McGowan in the 5th inning of a 5-4 loss to the Toronto Blue Jays; it was the second of back-to-back homers, following Jorge Velandia's second homer of the season.

On September 27, Peña took the RBI record, previously set by Jorge Cantú at 117 in 2005.  He tied it with an RBI single in the 1st inning for his 117th, and broke it with a solo home run in the 5th inning for his 118th.  Both RBIs were off Chien-Ming Wang in a 12-4 loss to the New York Yankees.  He finished the season with 46 home runs, 121 RBIs and a 1.037 OPS (.411 OBP, .627 SLG, both Rays season records), becoming the first Devil Ray to finish a season with at least a 1.000 OPS.  Peña went on to win Comeback Player of the Year honors for the American League.

Carl Crawford approached the 1,000-hit plateau, but a groin pull in late September ended his season early, leaving him stuck at 990 career hits.  He will most likely become the first Devil Ray to hit 1,000 hits with the club early next season.  It will not be the first four-digit hit milestone for the club; Wade Boggs got his 3,000th hit while with the team in 1999.  His injury, however, did not prevent him from finishing the season with a share of the AL stolen base title with Brian Roberts of the Baltimore Orioles.  Both players finished the year with 50, marking the fourth time he's led or shared the lead in that category for a year.

Delmon Young became the first Rays rookie to play in every game of a 162-game season, setting a team record for most at bats taken in a season with 645.  He is the second Rays player ever to play in every game in a season, after Aubrey Huff in 2003.  Young was held from the lineup for the last game of the season after not hustling to first on a ground ball during the previous game, but apologized for not giving that game his all and entered the final game as a mid-game replacement.  At the end of the season, he was considered a leading candidate for the AL Rookie of the Year award.

On September 10, Scott Kazmir became the first Rays pitcher to record 200 strikeouts in a season, in a 1-0 victory over the Boston Red Sox.  His 200th strikeout victim for the year was Coco Crisp.  He ultimately claimed the A.L. strikeout title, finishing the year with 239.  (A one-game playoff permitted Jake Peavy to take the MLB strikeout title with 240.)  Kazmir is also the first D-Ray starter to finish a season with at least 10 strikeouts per 9 innings (10.41).

During the course of the season, Scott Kazmir became the first Rays starting pitcher to log enough starts and innings to begin compiling rate-based team all-time pitching records, such as ERA.

Season standings

Record vs. opponents

Roster

Game log

|- style="background-color:#ffbbbb"
| 1 || April 2 || @ Yankees || 9 – 5 || Vizcaíno (1-0) || Stokes (0-1) || || 55,035 || 0-1
|- style="background-color:#bbbbbb"
| -- || April 4 || @ Yankees || colspan=5|Postponed (rain)  || 0-1
|- style="background-color:#bbffbb"
| 2 || April 5 || @ Yankees || 7 – 6 || Lugo (1-0) || Vizcaíno (1-1)  || Reyes (1) || 52,096 || 1-1
|- style="background-color:#bbffbb"
| 3 || April 6 || Blue Jays || 6 – 5 || Ryu (1-0) || Ryan (0-1) || || 38,437|| 2-1
|- style="background-color:#ffbbbb"
| 4 || April 7 || Blue Jays || 8 – 5 || Marcum (1-0) || Fossum (0-1) || Ryan (2) || 18,495 || 2-2
|- style="background-color:#ffbbbb"
| 5 || April 8 || Blue Jays || 6 – 3 || Halladay (1-0) || Kazmir (0-1) || Janssen (1) || 12,436 || 2-3
|- style="background-color:#ffbbbb"
| 6 || April 9 || @ Rangers || 8 – 4 || McCarthy (1-1) || Jackson (0-1) || || 21,547 || 2-4
|- style="background-color:#ffbbbb"
| 7 || April 10 || @ Rangers || 12 – 9 || Feldman (1-0) || Seo (0-1) || || 23,897 || 2-5
|- style="background-color:#bbffbb"
| 8 || April 11 || @ Rangers || 6 – 5 || Shields (1-0) || Tejeda (1-1) || || 33,674 || 3-5
|- style="background-color:#ffbbbb"
| 9 || April 12 || @ Twins || 3 – 2 || Nathan (1-0) || Stokes (0-2) || || 15,869 || 3-6
|- style="background-color:#bbffbb"
| 10 || April 13 || @ Twins || 4 – 2 || Kazmir (2-0) || Santana (2-1) || Reyes (3) || 27,783 || 4-6
|- style="background-color:#ffbbbb"
| 11 || April 14 || @ Twins || 12 – 5 || Ponson (1-1) || Jackson (0-2) || || 35,269 || 4-7
|- style="background-color:#bbffbb"
| 12 || April 15 || @ Twins || 6 – 4 || Stokes (1-2) || Nathan (1-1) || Reyes (4) || 27,024 || 5-7
|- style="background-color:#ffbbbb"
| 13 || April 16 || Orioles || 9 – 7 || Guthrie (1-0) || Ryu (1-1) || Ray (4) || 9,157 || 5-8
|- style="background-color:#bbffbb"
| 14 || April 17 || Orioles || 6 – 4 || Fossum (1-1) || Trachsel (0-1) || Reyes (5) || 9,575 || 6-8
|- style="background-color:#ffbbbb"
| 15 || April 18 || Orioles || 6 – 4 || Bédard (3-1) || Glover (0-1) || Ray (5) || 10,540 || 6-9
|- style="background-color:#ffbbbb"
| 16 || April 20 || Indians || 4 – 3 || Hernández (1-1) || Salas (0-1) || Borowski (6) || 13,391 || 6-10
|- style="background-color:#bbffbb"
| 17 || April 21 || Indians || 6 – 5 || Seo (1-1) || Byrd (1-1) || Reyes (6) || 22,805 || 7-10
|- style="background-color:#ffbbbb"
| 18 || April 22 || Indians || 6 – 4 || Mastny (1-0) || Stokes (1-3) || Borowski (7) || 18,131 || 7-11
|- style="background-color:#bbffbb"
| 19 || April 23 || Yankees || 10 – 8 || Fossum (2-1) || Igawa (1-1) || || 20,409 || 8-11
|- style="background-color:#bbffbb"
| 20 || April 24 || Yankees || 4 – 6 || Salas (1-1) || Wang (0-1) || Reyes (7) || 22,328 || 9-11
|- style="background-color:#ffbbbb"
| 21 || April 25 || @ Angels || 9 – 1 || Lackey (3-2) || Jackson (0-3) || || 36,850 || 9-12
|- style="background-color:#ffbbbb"
| 22 || April 26 || @ Angels || 11 – 3 || Colón (2-0) || Seo (1-2) || || 35,597 || 9-13
|- style="background-color:#bbffbb"
| 23 || April 27 || @ Athletics || 4 – 1 || Shields (2-0) || Gaudin (1-1) || Reyes (8) || 15,388 || 10-13
|- style="background-color:#ffbbbb"
| 24 || April 28 || @ Athletics || 12 – 5 || Haren (3-2) || Fossum (2-2) || || 26,760 || 10-14
|- style="background-color:#bbffbb"
| 25 || April 29 || @ Athletics || 5 – 3 || Kazmir (2-1) || Braden (1-1) || Reyes (9) || 23,827 || 11-14

|- style="background-color:#ffbbbb"
| 26 || May 1 || Twins || 9 – 1 || Ponson (2-3) || Jackson (0-4) || ||8,773 || 11-15
|- style="background-color:#bbffbb"
| 27 || May 2 || Twins || 4 – 3  || Reyes (1-0) || Guerrier (0-1) ||  || 9,101 || 12-15
|- style="background-color:#bbffbb"
| 28 || May 3 || Twins || 6 – 4 || Shields (3-0) || Ortiz (3-2) || Reyes (10) || 8,793 || 13-15
|- style="background-color:#ffbbbb"
| 29 || May 4 || Athletics || 5 – 2 || Duchscherer (3-1) || Glover (0-2) || Street (8) || 11,546 || 13-16
|- style="background-color:#bbffbb"
| 30 || May 5 || Athletics || 3 – 2  || Lugo (2-0) || Marshall (1-2) || || 16,604 || 14-16
|- style="background-color:#ffbbbb"
| 31 || May 6 || Athletics || 5 – 3 || Blanton (3-1) || Jackson (0-5) || Street (9) || 16,880 || 14-17
|- style="background-color:#ffbbbb"
| 32 || May 8 || @ Orioles || 8 – 3 || Guthrie (2-1) || Seo (1-3) || || 17,818 || 14-18
|- style="background-color:#ffbbbb"
| 33 || May 9 || @ Orioles || 1 – 0  || Parrish (1-0) || Stokes (1-4) || || 14,780 || 14-19
|- style="background-color:#ffbbbb"
| 34 || May 10 || @ Orioles || 11 – 6 || Cabrera (3-3) || Fossum (2-3) || || 15,915 || 14-20
|- style="background-color:#ffbbbb"
| 35 || May 11 || @ Blue Jays || 5 – 1 || Burnett (3-3) || Kazmir (2-2) || || 20,542 || 14-21
|- style="background-color:#ffbbbb"
| 36 || May 12 || @ Blue Jays || 5 – 4 || Downs (1-0) || Stokes (1-5) || Accardo (1) || 23,208 || 14-22
|- style="background-color:#bbffbb"
| 37 || May 13 || @ Blue Jays || 2 – 1 || Seo (2-3)|| Frasor (1-2)|| Reyes (11) || 25,453 || 15-22
|- style="background-color:#bbffbb"
| 38 || May 15 || Rangers* || 4 – 3  || Stokes (2-5) || Feldman (1-2) || || 8,443 || 16-22
|- style="background-color:#bbffbb"
| 39 || May 16 || Rangers* || 11 – 8 || Fossum (3-3) || Padilla (1-6) || Reyes (12) || 8,839 || 17-22
|- style="background-color:#bbffbb"
| 40 || May 17 || Rangers* || 8 – 6  || Glover (1-2) || Eyre (1-2) || || 9,635 || 18-22
|- style="background-color:#ffbbbb"
| 41 || May 18 || Marlins || 8 – 4 || Kim (2-2) || Jackson (0-6) || || 13,003 || 18-23
|- style="background-color:#ffbbbb"
| 42 || May 19 || Marlins || 7 – 2 || Willis (6-3) || Seo (2-4) || || 19,566 || 18-24
|- style="background-color:#ffbbbb"
| 43 || May 20 || Marlins || 4 – 3 || Mitre (2-2) || Shawn Camp (0-1) || Gregg (3) || 23,554 || 18-25
|- style="background-color:#ffbbbb"
| 44 || May 22 || Mariners || 5 – 2 || Washburn (4-4) || Orvella (0-1) || Putz (11) || 9,254 || 18-26
|- style="background-color:#ffbbbb"
| 45 || May 23 || Mariners || 5 – 1 || Batista (4-4) || Fossum (3-4) || || 8,440 || 18-27
|- style="background-color:#bbffbb"
| 46 || May 24 || Mariners || 13 – 12 || Seo (3-4) || White (1-1) || || 9,149 || 19-27
|- style="background-color:#ffbbbb"
| 47 || May 25 || @ White Sox || 5 – 4 || Jenks (2-1) || Orvella (0-2) || || 34,538 || 19-28
|- style="background-color:#bbbbbb"
| -- || May 26 || @ White Sox || colspan=5|Postponed (rain)  || 19-28
|- style="background-color:#bbffbb"
| 48 || May 27 || @ White Sox || 11 – 5 || Kazmir (3-2) || Vázquez (2-3) || || 38,103  || 20-28
|- style="background-color:#bbffbb"
| 49 || May 28 || Tigers || 6 – 5 || Glover (2-2) || Jones (1-2) || || 14,769 || 21-28
|- style="background-color:#ffbbbb"
| 50 || May 29 || Tigers || 14 – 2 || Bonderman (4-0) || Fossum (3-5) || || 11,518 || 21-29
|- style="background-color:#bbffbb"
| 51 || May 30 || Tigers || 5 – 3 || Shields (4-0) || Robertson (4-5) || || 12,435 || 22-29
|-
| colspan=8| *At Walt Disney World in Orlando, Florida

|- style="background-color:#ffbbbb"
| 52 || June 1 || Royals || 4 – 1 || Bannister (1-3) || Kazmir (3-3) || Dotel (1) || 12,032 || 22-30
|- style="background-color:#ffbbbb"
| 53 || June 2 || Royals || 9 – 4 || Pérez (3-5) || Jackson (0-7) || || 14,403 || 22-31
|- style="background-color:#bbffbb"
| 54 || June 3 || Royals || 5 – 1 || Howell (1-0) || Elarton (1-2) || || 12,220 || 23-31
|- style="background-color:#bbffbb"
| 55 || June 4 || Royals || 4 – 2 || Shields (5-0) || Meche (3-5) || Reyes (14) || 9,435 || 24-31
|- style="background-color:#ffbbbb"
| 56 || June 5 || @ Blue Jays || 12 – 11 || Towers (2-3) || Fossum (3-6) || || 19,063 || 24-32
|- style="background-color:#bbffbb"
| 57 || June 6 || @ Blue Jays || 6 – 2 || Kazmir (4-3) || Ohka (2-5) || || 16,663 || 25-32
|- style="background-color:#bbffbb"
| 58 || June 7 || @ Blue Jays || 5 – 3 || Glover (3-2) || Accardo (1-1) || Reyes (15) || 37,105 || 26-32
|- style="background-color:#ffbbbb"
| 59 || June 8 || @ Marlins || 14 – 8 || Miller (2-0) || Stokes (2-6) || || 13,520 || 26-33
|- style="background-color:#bbffbb"
| 60 || June 9 || @ Marlins || 7 – 2 || Shields (6-0) || Willis (7-5) || || 20,189 || 27-33
|- style="background-color:#bbffbb"
| 61 || June 10 || @ Marlins || 9 – 4 || Sonnanstine (1-0) || VandenHurk (1-2) || || 11,525 || 28-33
|- style="background-color:#bbffbb"
| 62 || June 12 || Padres || 11 – 4 || Fossum (4-6) || Meredith (2-5)|| || 12,870 || 29-33
|- style="background-color:#ffbbbb"
| 63 || June 13 || Padres || 9 – 0 || Peavy (8-1) || Jackson (0-8) || || 12,020 || 29-34
|- style="background-color:#ffbbbb"
| 64 || June 14 || Padres || 7 – 1 || Germano (5-0) || Howell (1-1) || || 19,270 || 29-35
|- style="background-color:#ffbbbb"
| 65 || June 15 || @ Rockies || 12 – 2 || López (3-0) || Shields (6-1) || || 25,762 || 29-36
|- style="background-color:#ffbbbb"
| 66 || June 16 || @ Rockies || 10 – 5 || Buchholz (4-3) || Sonnanstine (1-1) || || 30,101 || 29-37
|- style="background-color:#bbffbb"
| 67 || June 17 || @ Rockies || 7 – 4 || Kazmir (5-3) || Cook (4-4) || Reyes (16) || 31,190 || 30-37
|- style="background-color:#bbffbb"
| 68 || June 18 || @ D-backs || 10 – 2 || Hammel (1-0) || Hernández (5-5) || || 18,963 || 31-37
|- style="background-color:#ffbbbb"
| 69 || June 19 || @ D-backs || 10 – 8  || Lyon (5-2) || Reyes (1-1) || || 19,761 || 31-38
|- style="background-color:#ffbbbb"
| 70 || June 20 || @ D-backs || 7 – 4 || Owings (5-1) || Shields (6-2) || Valverde (23) || 31,805 || 31-39
|- style="background-color:#ffbbbb"
| 71 || June 22 || Dodgers || 6 – 3 || Lowe (8-6) || Sonnanstine (1-2) || Saito (20) || 14,961 || 31-40
|- style="background-color:#bbffbb"
| 72 || June 23 || Dodgers || 4 – 3 || Fossum (5-6) || Wolf (8-6) || Reyes (17) || 24,068 || 32-40
|- style="background-color:#bbffbb"
| 73 || June 24 || Dodgers || 9 – 4 || Jackson (1-8) || Kuo (1-3) || || 18,248 || 33-40
|- style="background-color:#ffbbbb"
| 74 || June 25 || White Sox || 5 – 4 || Danks (4-6) || Fossum (5-7) || Jenks (19) || 10,514 || 33-41
|- style="background-color:#ffbbbb"
| 75 || June 26 || White Sox || 6 – 1 || Garland (5-5) || Shields (6-3) || || 11,954 || 33-42
|- style="background-color:#ffbbbb"
| 76 || June 27 || White Sox || 5 – 3 || Buehrle (5-4) || Glover (3-3) || Jenks (20) || 10,492 || 33-43
|- style="background-color:#ffbbbb"
| 77 || June 28 || White Sox || 5 – 1 || Vázquez (4-5) || Kazmir (5-4) || || 13,496 || 33-44
|- style="background-color:#ffbbbb"
| 78 || June 29 || @ Indians || 2 – 1 || Borowski (1-3) || Shawn Camp (0-2) || || 34,557 || 33-45
|- style="background-color:#ffbbbb"
| 79 || June 30 || @ Indians || 8 – 6 || Sabathia (12-2) || Howell (1-2) || Borowski (23) || 36,726 || 33-46

|- style="background-color:#ffbbbb"
| 80 || July 1 || @ Indians ||  3 – 2 || Lee (5-4) || Shields (6-4) || Borowski (24) || 30,410 || 33-47
|- style="background-color:#ffbbbb"
| 81 || July 2 || @ Indians || 10 – 2 || Carmona (9-4) || Sonnanstine (1-3) || || 34,372 || 33-48
|- style="background-color:#ffbbbb"
| 82 || July 3 || @ Red Sox || 4 – 1 || Matsuzaka (10-5) || Kazmir (5-5) || || 37,005 || 33-49
|- style="background-color:#ffbbbb"
| 83 || July 4 || @ Red Sox || 7 – 5 || Wakefield (9-8) || Jackson (1-9) || Papelbon (20) || 36,629 || 33-50
|- style="background-color:#ffbbbb"
| 84 || July 5 || @ Red Sox || 15 – 4 || Beckett (12-2) || Howell (1-3) || || 37,044 || 33-51
|- style="background-color:#bbffbb"
| 85 || July 6 || @ Royals || 6 – 5 || Shields (7-4) || Pérez (4-8) || Glover (1) || 18,753 || 34-51
|- style="background-color:#ffbbbb"
| 86 || July 7 || @ Royals || 8 – 7 || Dotel (2-1) || Shawn Camp (0-3) || || 20,458 || 34-52
|- style="background-color:#ffbbbb"
| 87 || July 8 || @ Royals || 12 – 4 || de la Rosa (7-9) || Kazmir (5-6) || || 14,726 || 34-53
|- style="background-color:#ffbbbb"
| 88 || July 12 || Yankees || 7 – 3 || Pettitte (5-6) || Shields (7-5) || || 21,907 || 34-54
|- style="background-color:#bbffbb"
| 89 || July 13 || Yankees || 6 – 4 || Kazmir (6-6) || Clemens (2-4) || Glover (2) || 29,803 || 35-54
|- style="background-color:#ffbbbb"
| 90 || July 14 || Yankees || 6 – 4 || Wang (10-4) || Sonnanstine (1-4) || Rivera (12) || 36,048 || 35-55
|- style="background-color:#ffbbbb"
| 91 || July 15 || Yankees || 7 – 6 || Vizcaíno (5-2) || Fossum (5-8) || Rivera (13) || 36,048 || 35-56
|- style="background-color:#bbffbb"
| 92 || July 17 || Angels || 8 – 3 || Shields (8-5) || Santana (5-11) || || 9,430 || 36-56
|- style="background-color:#bbffbb"
| 93 || July 18 || Angels || 7 – 2 || Kazmir (7-6) || Colón (6-5) || || 13,521 || 37-56
|- style="background-color:#ffbbbb"
| 94 || July 19 || Angels || 3 – 0 || Escobar (11-3) || Sonnanstine (1-5) || Rodríguez (25) || 18,163 || 37-57
|- style="background-color:#bbffbb"
| 95 || July 20 || @ Yankees || 14 – 4 || Jackson (2-9) || Mussina (4-7) || || 53,957 || 38-57
|- style="background-color:#ffbbbb"
| 96 || July 21 || @ Yankees || 7 – 3 || Vizcaíno (7-2) || Ryu (1-2) || || 54,412 || 38-58
|- style="background-color:#ffbbbb"
| 97 || July 21 || @ Yankees || 17 – 5 || Vizcaíno (8-2) || Howell (1-4) || || 52,983 || 38-59
|- style="background-color:#ffbbbb"
| 98 || July 22 || @ Yankees || 21 – 4 || Pettitte (6-6) || Shields (8-6) || || 54,751 || 38-60
|- style="background-color:#ffbbbb"
| 99 || July 24 || @ Orioles || 3 – 0 || Cabrera (7-10) || Kazmir (7-7) || Walker (2) || 42,579 || 38-61
|- style="background-color:#ffbbbb"
| 100 || July 25 || @ Orioles || 6 – 1 || Bédard (10-4) || Sonnanstine (1-6) || || 21,427 || 38-62
|- style="background-color:#ffbbbb"
| 101 || July 26 || @ Orioles || 10 – 7 || Bell (3-1) || Jackson (2-10) || || 22,393 || 38-63
|- style="background-color:#ffbbbb"
| 102 || July 27 || Red Sox || 7 – 1 || Wakefield (12-9) || Hammel (1-1)  || || 33,144 || 38-64
|- style="background-color:#ffbbbb"
| 103 || July 28 || Red Sox || 12 – 6  || Snyder (2-2) || Stokes (2-7) || || 36,048 || 38-65
|- style="background-color:#bbffbb"
| 104 || July 29 || Red Sox || 5 – 2 || Glover (4-3) || Matsuzaka (12-8) || || 34,813 || 39-65
|- style="background-color:#bbffbb"
| 105 || July 30 || Blue Jays || 5 – 4  || Dohmann (1-0) || Wolfe (2-1) || || 8,807 || 40-65
|- style="background-color:#ffbbbb"
| 106 || July 31 || Blue Jays || 2 – 0 || Litsch (4-4) || Jackson (2-11) || Accardo (18) || 10,569 || 40-66

|- style="background-color:#bbffbb"
| 107 || August 1 || Blue Jays || 6 – 2 || Glover (5-3) || Towers (5-8) || || 10,109 || 41-66
|- style="background-color:#ffbbbb"
| 108 || August 3 || Orioles || 3 – 1 || Cabrera (8-11) || Shields (8-7) || Báez (1) || 15,542 || 41-67
|- style="background-color:#bbffbb"
| 109 || August 4 || Orioles || 9 – 2 || Kazmir (8-7) || Burres (5-5) || || 18,230 || 42-67
|- style="background-color:#ffbbbb"
| 110 || August 5 || Orioles || 11 – 3 || Bédard (12-4) || Sonnanstine (1-7) || || 19,845 || 42-68
|- style="background-color:#ffbbbb"
| 111 || August 6 || @ Tigers || 6 – 4 || Miner (2-3) || Glover (5-4) || Jones (29) || 39,289 || 42-69
|- style="background-color:#ffbbbb"
| 112 || August 7 || @ Tigers || 9 – 6 || Byrdak (1-0) || Wheeler (1-5) ||Jones (30) || 35,288 || 42-70
|- style="background-color:#bbffbb"
| 113 || August 8 || @ Tigers || 7 – 1 || Shields (9-7) || Durbin (7-4) || || 37,777 || 43-70
|- style="background-color:#bbffbb"
| 114 || August 9 || @ Tigers || 8 – 1 || Kazmir (9-7) || Bonderman (10-5)  || || 38,789 || 44-70
|- style="background-color:#ffbbbb"
| 115 || August 10 || @ Rangers || 7 – 4 || Wood (2-1) || Sonnanstine (1-8) || Wilson (4) || 28,314 || 44-71
|- style="background-color:#bbffbb"
| 116 || August 11 || @ Rangers || 3 – 0 || Jackson (3-11) || Rheinecker (1-1)  || || 36,709 || 45-71
|- style="background-color:#ffbbbb"
| 117 || August 12 || @ Rangers || 9 – 1 || Eyre (4-5) || Hammel (1-2) || || 24,042 || 45-72
|- style="background-color:#ffbbbb"
| 118 || August 13 || @ Red Sox || 3 – 0 || Wakefield (14-10) || Shields (9-8) || Papelbon (28) || 36,808 || 45-73
|- style="background-color:#ffbbbb"
| 119 || August 14 || @ Red Sox || 2 – 1 || Gagné (3-0) ||Reyes (1-2) || || 36,837 || 45-74
|- style="background-color:#bbffbb"
| 120 || August 15 || @ Red Sox || 6 – 5 || Sonnanstine (2-8) || Matsuzaka (13-9) || Reyes (18) || 36,413 || 46-74
|- style="background-color:#ffbbbb"
| 121 || August 17 || Indians || 2 – 1 || Byrd (11-5) || Jackson (3-12) || Borowski (34) || 15,343 || 46-75
|- style="background-color:#ffbbbb"
| 122 || August 18 || Indians || 8 – 1 || Westbrook (4-7) || Hammel (1-3) || || 24,397 || 46-76
|- style="background-color:#bbffbb"
| 123 || August 19 || Indians || 4 – 3  || Dohmann (2-0) || Pérez (0-1) || || 22,328 || 47-76
|- style="background-color:#ffbbbb"
| 124 || August 20 || Red Sox || 6 – 0 || Wakefield (15-10) || Kazmir (9-8) || || 16,843 || 47-77
|- style="background-color:#ffbbbb"
| 125 || August 21 || Red Sox || 8 – 6 || Lester (2-0) || Sonnanstine (2-9) || Papelbon (30) || 16,393 || 47-78
|- style="background-color:#bbffbb"
| 126 || August 22 || Red Sox || 2 – 1 || Jackson (4-12) || Matsuzaka (13-10) || Reyes (19) || 17,839 || 48-78
|- style="background-color:#ffbbbb"
| 127 || August 23 || Athletics || 12 – 2 || Gaudin (10-9) || Hammel (1-4) || || 9,444 || 48-79
|- style="background-color:#bbffbb"
| 128 || August 24 || Athletics || 12 – 2 || Shields (10-8) || DiNardo (8-7) || || 9,592 || 49-79
|- style="background-color:#bbffbb"
| 129 || August 25 || Athletics || 14 – 3 || Kazmir (10-8) || Blanton (11-9) || || 18,163 || 50-79
|- style="background-color:#bbffbb"
| 130 || August 26 || Athletics || 7 – 4  || Sonnanstine (3-9) || Haren (14-5) || Reyes (20)|| 19,044 || 51-79
|- style="background-color:#ffbbbb"
| 131 || August 27 || @ White Sox || 5 – 4  || Contreras (7-16) || Wheeler (1-6) || Jenks (36)|| 37,030 || 51-80
|- style="background-color:#bbffbb"
| 132 || August 28 || @ Orioles || 15 – 8 || Dohmann (3-0) || Hoey (1-3) || || 17,781 || 52-80
|- style="background-color:#bbffbb"
| 133 || August 29 || @ Orioles || 5 – 4  || Balfour (1-2) || Bell (3-3) || Reyes (21) || 16,944 || 53-80
|- style="background-color:#bbffbb"
| 134 || August 30 || @ Orioles || 8 – 6 || Kazmir (11-8) || Guthrie (7-5) || Reyes (22) || 17,546 || 54-80
|- style="background-color:#bbffbb"
| 135 || August 31 || @ Yankees || 9 – 1 || Sonnanstine (4-9) || Hughes (2-3) || || 53,275 || 55-80

|- style="background-color:#ffbbbb"
| 136 || September 1 || @ Yankees || 9 – 6 || Kennedy (1-0) || Jackson (4-13) || Rivera (23) || 53,637 || 55-81
|- style="background-color:#bbffbb"
| 137 || September 2 || @ Yankees || 8 – 2 || Hammel (2-4) || Pettitte (12-8) || || 53,957 || 56-81
|- style="background-color:#bbffbb"
| 138 || September 3 || Orioles || 9 – 7 || Shields (11-8) || Hoey (1-4) || || 10,350 || 57-81
|- style="background-color:#ffbbbb"
| 139 || September 4 || Orioles || 8 – 4 || Bradford (3-6) || Wheeler (1-7) || || 9,112 || 57-82
|- style="background-color:#bbffbb"
| 140 || September 5 || Orioles || 17 – 2 || Sonnanstine (5-9) || Liz (0-2) || || 9,856 || 58-82
|- style="background-color:#ffbbbb"
| 141 || September 7 || Blue Jays || 7 – 2 || McGowan (10-8) || Jackson (4-14) || || 18,617 || 58-83
|- style="background-color:#bbffbb"
| 142 || September 8 || Blue Jays || 5 – 4 || Reyes (2-2) || Accardo (4-4)|| || 19,822 || 59-83
|- style="background-color:#bbffbb"
| 143 || September 9 || Blue Jays || 3 – 2 || Shields (10-8) || Litsch (5-8) || Reyes (23) || 20,556 || 60-83
|- style="background-color:#bbffbb"
| 144 || September 10 || @ Red Sox  || 2 – 1 || Kazmir (12-8)  || Schilling (8-7) || Reyes (24) || 36,907 || 61-83
|- style="background-color:#ffbbbb"
| 145 || September 11 || @ Red Sox || 16 – 10 || Corey (1-0) || Switzer (0-1) || || 36,640 || 61-84
|- style="background-color:#ffbbbb"
| 146 || September 12 || @ Red Sox || 5 – 4 || Papelbon (1-2) || Reyes (2-3) || || 36,931 || 61-85
|- style="background-color:#ffbbbb"
| 147 || September 13 || @ Mariners || 8 – 7 || Rowland-Smith (1-0) || Wheeler (1-8) || Putz (38) || 23,991 || 61-86
|- style="background-color:#ffbbbb"
| 148 || September 14 || @ Mariners || 2 – 1 || Putz (4-1) || Glover (5-5) || || 30,164 || 61-87
|- style="background-color:#bbffbb"
| 149 || September 15 || @ Mariners || 6 – 2 || Kazmir (13-8) || H. Ramírez (8-7) || || 33,793 || 62-87
|- style="background-color:#bbffbb"
| 150 || September 16 || @ Mariners || 9 – 2 || Sonnanstine (6-9) || Washburn (9-15) || || 36,234 || 63-87
|- style="background-color:#ffbbbb"
| 151 || September 17 || @ Angels || 10 – 7 || Oliver (3-0) || Jackson (4-15) || || 37,530 || 63-88
|- style="background-color:#ffbbbb"
| 152 || September 18 || @ Angels || 2 – 1 || Lackey (17-9) || Hammel (2-5) || Rodríguez (36) || 36,313 || 63-89
|- style="background-color:#ffbbbb"
| 153 || September 19 || @ Angels || 2 – 1 || Santana (7-13) || Howell (1-5) || Rodríguez (37) || 33,699 || 63-90
|- style="background-color:#ffbbbb"
| 154 || September 21 || Red Sox || 8 – 1 || Beckett (20-6) || Kazmir (13-9) || || 27,369 || 63-91
|- style="background-color:#ffbbbb"
| 155 || September 22 || Red Sox || 8 – 6 || Gagné (4-2) || Reyes (2-4) || Papelbon (36) || 34,626 || 63-92
|- style="background-color:#bbffbb"
| 156 || September 23 || Red Sox || 5 – 4 || Jackson (5-15) || Wakefield (16-12) || Reyes (25) || 30,310 || 64-92
|- style="background-color:#bbffbb"
| 157 || September 25 || Yankees || 7 – 6  || Glover (6-5) || Karstens (1-4) || || 24,503 || 65-92
|- style="background-color:#ffbbbb"
| 158 || September 26 || Yankees || 12 – 4 || Wang (19-7) || Howell (1-6) || || 21,621 || 65-93
|- style="background-color:#ffbbbb"
| 159 || September 27 || Yankees || 3 – 1 || Hughes (5-3) || Switzer (0-2) || Veras (1) || 28,962 || 65-94
|- style="background-color:#ffbbbb"
| 160 || September 28 || @ Blue Jays || 5 – 4 || McGowan (12-10) || Sonnanstine (6-10) || Accardo (30) || 34,670 || 65-95
|- style="background-color:#ffbbbb"
| 161 || September 29 || @ Blue Jays || 5 – 3 || Downs (4-2) || Wheeler (1-9) || || 37,681 || 65-96
|- style="background-color:#bbffbb"
| 162 || September 30 || @ Blue Jays || 8 – 5 || Hammel (3-5) || Burnett (10-8) || Reyes (26) || 44,156 || 66-96

Player stats

Batting

Starters by position 
Note: Pos = Position; G = Games played; AB = At bats; H = Hits; Avg. = Batting average; HR = Home runs; RBI = Runs batted in

Other batters 
Note: G = Games played; AB = At bats; H = Hits; Avg. = Batting average; HR = Home runs; RBI = Runs batted in

Pitching

Starting pitchers 
Note: G = Games pitched; IP = Innings pitched; W = Wins; L = Losses; ERA = Earned run average; SO = Strikeouts

Other pitchers 
Note: G = Games pitched; IP = Innings pitched; W = Wins; L = Losses; ERA = Earned run average; SO = Strikeouts

Relief pitchers 
Note: G = Games pitched; W = Wins; L = Losses; SV = Saves; ERA = Earned run average; SO = Strikeouts

Farm system

LEAGUE CHAMPIONS: Montgomery, Columbus

References

Game Logs:
1st Half: Tampa Bay Devil Rays Game Log on ESPN.com
2nd Half: Tampa Bay Devil Rays Game Log on ESPN.com
Batting Statistics: Tampa Bay Devil Rays Batting Stats on ESPN.com
Pitching Statistics: Tampa Bay Devil Rays Pitching Stats on ESPN.com
2007 Tampa Bay Devil Rays at Baseball Reference

Tampa Bay Devil Rays seasons
Tampa Bay Devil Rays season
Tampa Bay Devil Rays